The canton of Thiviers is an administrative division of the Dordogne department, southwestern France. Its borders were modified at the French canton reorganisation which came into effect in March 2015. Its seat is in Thiviers.

It consists of the following communes:

Chalais
La Coquille
Corgnac-sur-l'Isle
Eyzerac
Firbeix
Jumilhac-le-Grand
Lempzours
Mialet
Nantheuil
Nanthiat
Négrondes
Saint-Front-d'Alemps
Saint-Jean-de-Côle
Saint-Jory-de-Chalais
Saint-Martin-de-Fressengeas
Saint-Paul-la-Roche
Saint-Pierre-de-Côle
Saint-Pierre-de-Frugie
Saint-Priest-les-Fougères
Saint-Romain-et-Saint-Clément
Sorges et Ligueux en Périgord
Thiviers
Vaunac

References

Cantons of Dordogne